Delitto a Porta Romana (Crime at Porta Romana) is a 1980 Italian "poliziottesco"-comedy film directed by Bruno Corbucci. It is the seventh chapter in the Nico Giraldi film series starred by Tomas Milian.

Cast 
 Tomas Milian: Nico Giraldi 
 Bombolo: Franco Bertarelli a.k.a. "Venticello"
 Olimpia Di Nardo: Angela Giraldi
 Nerina Montagnani: Grandmother of Angela
 Elio Crovetto: Bartolo a.k.a. "il Monzese" 
 Lino Patruno: Enrico Vitucci 
 Massimo Vanni: Brigadier Gargiulo
 Aldo Ralli: Professor Baldi
 Marina Frajese: Antonella 
 Franco Diogene: Busoni 
 Marcello Martana: Trentini
 Andrea Aureli: Maresciallo

References

External links

1980 films
Films directed by Bruno Corbucci
Films scored by Franco Micalizzi
Italian crime comedy films
Poliziotteschi films
Films set in Rome
1980s crime comedy films
1980 comedy films
1980s Italian-language films
1980s Italian films